Jordan Scarlett may refer to:

 Jordan Scarlett (footballer), born 1995
 Jordan Scarlett (American football), born 1996